Sino is a given name and surname. People with this name include:

 Jurgen Sino (born 1997), Albanian footballer
 Lou Sino (1930–1986), American trombone player and singer
 Lupe Sino (1917–1959), Spanish actress
 Sino Ganto (born 1987), South African rugby union player
 Sino Nyoka (born 1990), South African rugby union player